Jean-Richard Germont (born 2 April 1945) is a French former sports shooter. He competed in the 25 metre pistol event at the 1972 Summer Olympics.

References

1945 births
Living people
French male sport shooters
Olympic shooters of France
Shooters at the 1972 Summer Olympics
Place of birth missing (living people)